Moran Buzovski (born March 23, 1992) is a retired Israeli rhythmic gymnast, and a member of the National Israeli Rhythmic Gymnastics Team.

Personal life 
Buzovski was born in Petah Tikva, Israel. She has a twin sister named Sharon.

Career 
Buzovki started training in 1996 and belongs to the club Maccabi Petah Tikva. She started training unintentionally, at the age of 4, when her mother was looking for a hobby for her and her twin sister. She originally was meant to participate in floor gymnastics, but they arrived at the training ground at the wrong time, while a rhythmic gymnastics session was taking place. The coach, Yelena Zlickman encouraged the mother to enroll her twins for a trial. Sharon quit shortly after starting, but Moran stayed on to train.

Following her retirement as an athlete, Buzovski has become a trainer in Maccabi Tel-Aviv and in B-MOR schools she founded.

References

External links
 
 Moran Buzovski profile at the official London 2012 website

1992 births
Living people
Israeli rhythmic gymnasts
Gymnasts at the 2012 Summer Olympics
Olympic gymnasts of Israel
Jewish gymnasts
Israeli Jews
Sportspeople from Petah Tikva
Israeli twins
Medalists at the Rhythmic Gymnastics World Championships